Anarestanak (also Romanized as Anārestānak) is a village in Borun Rural District, in the Eslamiyeh District of Ferdows County, South Khorasan Province, Iran. At the 2006 census, its population was 324, in 111 families.

References 

Populated places in Ferdows County